WKBS-TV (channel 47) is a religious television station in Altoona, Pennsylvania, United States, owned and operated by Cornerstone Television. The station's transmitter is located in Logan Township.

WKBS-TV operates as a full-time satellite of Cornerstone's flagship station, Greensburg-licensed WPCB-TV (channel 40), whose studios are located in Wall, Pennsylvania. WKBS-TV covers areas of West-Central Pennsylvania that receive a marginal to non-existent over-the-air signal from WPCB-TV, although there is significant overlap between the two stations' contours otherwise. WKBS-TV is a straight simulcast of WPCB-TV; on-air references to WKBS-TV are limited to Federal Communications Commission (FCC)-mandated hourly station identifications during programming. Besides the transmitter, WKBS-TV does not maintain any physical presence in Altoona, and unlike its parent station, it does not broadcast in high definition and has a different subchannel lineup.

History
In 1983, Cornerstone Television was granted a construction permit for channel 47 in Altoona, Pennsylvania, to serve the Johnstown–Altoona market. It bought the transmitter used by the original WKBS-TV (channel 48) in Philadelphia when that station went dark in 1983, and used this transmitter to put channel 47 on the air November 2, 1985, reusing the WKBS-TV callsign.

Technical information

Subchannels
The station's digital signal is multiplexed:

Analog-to-digital conversion
WKBS-TV shut down its analog signal, over UHF channel 47, on June 12, 2009, the official date in which full-power television stations in the United States transitioned from analog to digital broadcasts under federal mandate. The station's digital signal remained on its pre-transition UHF channel 46. Through the use of PSIP, digital television receivers display the station's virtual channel as its former UHF analog channel 47.

References

External links

Television channels and stations established in 1985
KBS-TV
1985 establishments in Pennsylvania
Religious television stations in the United States
Court TV affiliates
Bounce TV affiliates
Ion Television affiliates
Dabl affiliates
Defy TV affiliates
TrueReal affiliates